The 2013–14 Illinois State Redbirds men's basketball team represented Illinois State University during the 2013–14 NCAA Division I men's basketball season. The Redbirds, led by second-year head coach Dan Muller, played their home games at Redbird Arena in Normal, Illinois as a member of the Missouri Valley Conference. They finished the season 18–16, 9–9 in conference play, to finish in a tie for fourth place. As the number five seed in the MVC tournament, they were defeated by Missouri State in a quarterfinal game. They received an invitation to the College Basketball Invitational where they won over Morehead State in the first round and Texas A&M in the quarterfinal round before losing to Siena in the semifinal round.

Roster

Schedule and results

|-
!colspan=9 style=|Exhibition Season

|-
!colspan=9 style=|Non-Conference Regular Season

|-
!colspan=9 style=|Missouri Valley Conference Regular Season

|-
!colspan=9 style=|State FarmMissouri Valley Conference {MVC} tournament
|-

|-
!colspan=9 style=|College Basketball Invitational {CBI}
|-

|-

Source

References

Illinois State Redbirds men's basketball seasons
Illinois State Redbirds men's basketball
Illinois State Redbirds men's basketball
Illinois State
Illinois State Redbirds